41241 is an LMS Ivatt Class 2 2-6-2T that was built at Crewe Works in September 1949. It is one of four members of the class left in preservation but one of only two that is located on the mainland (the other locomotive being 41312); the other pair being located on the Isle of Wight.

Working Life 
Number 41241 was built by British Railways at Crewe Works in September 1949. From new it was allocated to Bath Green Park on the Somerset and Dorset Joint Railway and saw use on local passenger services over the S&D including the occasional banking job. Alongside spending the first 9 years allocated to the S&D it was reallocated to Bristol Barrow Road in July 1958, this however was not to last for long and it returned to its former home at Bath Green Park in October 1958 (by then under the control of the Western Region of British Railways).

Other shed allocations it was based at included: Wellington, Leamington Spa, Bangor, Croes Newydd, Llandudno Junction and Skipton. Following its allocation to Wellington, it was transferred back to the London Midland Region and was allocated to Leamington from February 1964. The final shed allocation was to Skipton, and it was to remain there for the rest of its working days on BR until 10 December 1966 when it was withdrawn from service.

Purchase from BR 
Number 41241 was purchased directly from BR by the nearby Keighley and Worth Valley Railway for preservation, arriving on the KWVR in March 1967 under its own power. Due to BR requiring that preserved steam locomotives did not wear the BR livery with their then current crest, it was repainted into lined maroon livery with the letters K&WVR written on her sidetanks. It wore this livery for the railway's reopening in June 1968 and in 1975 it made its only preservation mainline appearance at the Rocket 150 cavalcade in Shildon; it arrived and returned from the event under its own power with a set of the Worth Valley's coaches.

It was later repainted into authentic BR black livery and this livery it has worn for most of its preservation career; it has worn both the early and late versions of the BR black livery in preservation and is expected to keep this as its main livery. It last operated on a heritage railway in January 2013 and has since then being undergoing an overhaul at Haworth. With 2018 being the 50th anniversary since the K&WVR was opened in 1968 as well as the 50th anniversary since 1T57 in August 1968, the K&WVR had decided that it would return to its original maroon livery with the K&WVR lettering on her sidetanks. After an extensive overhaul, it was able to run in the K&WVR 50th Anniversary gala in July 2018, and now operates regularly on the K&WVR.

Photographs

References 

 

Individual locomotives of Great Britain
Preserved London, Midland and Scottish Railway steam locomotives
Keighley and Worth Valley Railway